Line 1 is the oldest of the three lines of the Athens Metro, running from  to . These railway lines gradually merged and converted to a rapid-transit system. It was merged into the Athens Metro network upon the opening of Lines 2 and 3 on 28 January 2000.

Network 

Line 1 connects the port of Piraeus with the northern suburb of Kifissia.

From Piraeus the line runs eastwards to Faliro and then north to Moschato, Kallithea, Tavros, Petralona, Thissio, Monastiraki, Omonia, Victoria and Attiki. Between Monastiraki and Attiki the line runs underground. At Monastiraki passengers can change to Line 3 and at Omonia and Attiki to Line 2. From Attiki the line continues north, following the alignment of the old Lavrion Square-Strofyli railway through Patissia, Nea Ionia, Iraklio, Marousi and terminates at Kifissia. At Nerantziotissa station passengers can change to the Athens Suburban Railway, for Athens International Airport.

Line 1 has a physical connection to Line 2 at Attiki station.

Proposed extensions and stations

Extension towards Nea Erythraia 

The first phase includes new stations at AOK, Nea Erithrea, Athens Metro and Ethniki Odos, but requires the reconstruction of Kifissia into an underground station. The second phase would be mostly sub-surface, with new stations at Anixi and Agios Stefanos.

The project was dropped by the company late in 2011 due to lack of funding and incomplete feasibility data.

Extension towards Palaio Faliro 

Attiko Metro also announced the possibility of a further extension towards Palaio Faliro, along Amfitheas Avenue, instead of Idreika.

Kaminia metro station 
In 2012, Attiko Metro S.A. included Kaminia metro station in the Athens Regulatory Plan. The new station will be sited near Kerani Square, between Piraeus and Neo Faliro.

Psalidi metro station 
In 2012, Attiko Metro S.A. included Psalidi metro station in the Athens Regulatory Plan. The new station will be sited between Iraklio and Eirini.

Other proposed extensions 

Stations 

The spelling of the station names on this table, in English and Greek, are according to the signage. The list also runs from south to north, because the former Athens–Piraeus Electric Railways measured all distances from Piraeus.

The layout of Line 1 stations have some variety, compared to the other two lines on the system (including the upcoming Line 4). Although most stations have two tracks and two side platforms, four stations (and ) have a Spanish solution layout of two tracks and three platforms,  has an island platform, and  has a bay platform with a second track on the western side of the platform.

Notes

References

External links 
Athens Metro official website

Athens Metro lines
Railway lines opened in 1869
1869 establishments in Greece